The 2010–11 NBL season is the 26th season for the Townsville Crocodiles in the NBL.

Off-season

Additions

Subtractions

Townsville also re-signed Brad Williamson, Todd Blanchfield, and Peter Crawford during the off-season.

Roster

Regular season

Standings

Game log

|- style="background-color:#ffcccc;"
| 1
| 16 September
| Cairns
| L 68-79
|  
| 
| 
| NPA Stadium, Townsville
| 0-1
|- style="background-color:#ffcccc;"
| 2
| 23 September
| Gold Coast
| L 76-79
|  
| 
| 
| NPA Stadium, Townsville
| 0-2
|- style="background-color:#ffcccc;"
| 2
| 25 September
| Gold Coast
| L 74-80
|  
| 
| 
| Mackay Basketball Stadium, Townsville
| 0-3

|- style="background-color:#bbffbb;"
| 1
| 16 October
| Cairns
| W 79-70
| Russell Hinder (18)
| Luke Schenscher, Gabe Freeman (6)
| Michael Cedar (5)
| The Swamp  4,201
| 1–0
|- style="background-color:#ffcccc;"
| 2
| 22 October
| @ Wollongong
| L 70-71
| Luke Schenscher (17)
| Luke Schenscher (9)
| Will Blalock (4)
| The Sandpit  3,367
| 1-1
|- style="background-color:#ffcccc;"
| 3
| 24 October
| @ Gold Coast
| L 90-94
| Will Blalock (18)
| Russell Hinder (8)
| Russell Hinder (4)
| The Furnace  3,429
| 1-2
|- style="background-color:#bbffbb;"
| 4
| 30 October
| Sydney
| W 80-79
| Luke Schenscher (26)
| Russell Hinder,  Gabe Freeman (12)
| Peter Crawford (4)
| The Swamp  3,956
| 2-2

|- style="background-color:#ffcccc;"
| 5
| 5 November
| Perth
| L 85-91
| Will Blalock (19)
| Russell Hinder, Gabe Freeman (5)
| Russell Hinder (4)
| The Swamp  3,364
| 2-3
|- style="background-color:#bbffbb;"
| 6
| 13 November
| @ Sydney
| W 64-59
| Will Blalock (13)
| Russell Hinder (8)
| Michael Cedar (4)
| The Kingdome  5,586
| 3-3
|- style="background-color:#bbffbb;"
| 7
| 21 November
| Adelaide
| W 77-73
| Michael Cedar (24)
| Luke Schenscher, Russell Hinder (9)
| Will Blalock, Peter Crawford (3)
| The Swamp  4,021
| 4-3
|- style="background-color:#bbffbb;"
| 8
| 26 November
| Melbourne
| W 94-66
| Michael Cedar (31)
| Luke Schenscher, Gabe Freeman (7)
| Nathan Crosswell (6)
| The Swamp  3,791
| 5-3

|- style="background-color:#ffcccc;"
| 9
| 3 December
| @ Adelaide
| L 79-92
| Luke Schenscher, Will Blalock (15)
| Luke Schenscher (12)
| Luke Schenscher, Will Blalock,Gabe Freeman (3)
| Adelaide Arena  4,595
| 5-4
|- style="background-color:#ffcccc;"
| 10
| 5 December
| @ Perth
| L 90-64
| Peter Crawford (13)
| Ben Allen (6)
| Will Blalock (6)
| Challenge Stadium  4,000 
| 5-5
|- style="background-color:#bbffbb;"
| 11
| 11 December
| Gold Coast
| W 91-86
| Luke Schenscher (21)
| Michael Cedar, Gabe Freeman (9)
| Michael Cedar (6)
| The Swamp  
| 
|- style="background-color:#"
| 12
| 17 December
| @ Gold Coast
| 
|  
| 
| 
| The Furnace
| 
|- style="background-color:#"
| 13
| December 38
| @ Cairns
| 
|  
| 
| 
| The Snakepit 
| 
|- style="background-color:#"
| 14
| 23 December
| @ Adelaide
|
| 
|
|
| The Dome  
| 
|- style="background-color:#"
| 15
| 31 December
| New Zealand
| 
|  
| 
| 
| The Swamp  
| 
|-

Finals

Player statistics

Regular season

Finals

Awards

Player of the Week
 Week 3 – Luke Schenscher
 Week 7 – Michael Cedar

Player of the Month

Coach of the Month

Mid-season Transfers

Additions

Subtractions

See also
2010-11 NBL season

References

External links
Official Site of the Crocs

Townsville
Townsville Crocodiles seasons